Cedric Lewis (born September 24, 1969) is an American former basketball player.  A 6'10" center from the University of Maryland, Lewis played three games for the Washington Bullets in the 1995–96 NBA season, scoring four points.

References

1969 births
Living people
Albany Patroons players
American expatriate basketball people in France
American expatriate basketball people in Germany
American men's basketball players
Archbishop Carroll High School (Washington, D.C.) alumni
Basketball players from Washington, D.C.
Centers (basketball)
Grand Rapids Hoops players
La Crosse Catbirds players
Maryland Terrapins men's basketball players
Omaha Racers players
Undrafted National Basketball Association players
Washington Bullets players